Pokémon: Jirachi, Wish Maker is a 2003 animated adventure fantasy film directed by Kunihiko Yuyama. It is the sixth theatrical release in the Pokémon franchise. It was accompanied by the short Gotta Dance.

The film was released in theaters in Japan on July 19, 2003, by Toho. The English-language adaptation was distributed by Miramax Films and released direct-to-video on June 1, 2004. The events of the film take place during the sixth season of Pokémon: Advanced, being the first film to feature characters from Advanced Generation.

The featured song in this movie is Asuca Hayashi's  in the Japanese version while the English version, Make a Wish, was sung by Cindy Mizelle. The tune of this song is also used as the lullaby May and Max's mother used to sing to them when they were children. This is the first movie in which the original Japanese song is also clearly used in the English version, and the first time in which the names of the guest characters were the same in both the English and Japanese versions.

The movie's main location, Forina, is based on Wulingyuan, located in the Hunan Province of China.

Plot

Gotta Dance! 
The plot of the short centers on Team Rocket and their newest base. After building their base, the Pokémon of Team Rocket manage to successfully capture three Whismur to provide entertainment to Giovanni when he arrives. To force the Whismur to cooperate, Meowth uses a baton that, when a switch was pressed on the end, made Pokémon dance uncontrollably.

Meanwhile, Pikachu, Treecko, Torchic, Mudkip and Lotad stumble upon the base and attempt to free the Whismur. One of the running gags in the short is how the dancing stick is constantly activated or on by accident. This leads to the accidental destruction of the home thanks to the controllable dancing of the Pokémon, including a wild Ludicolo and Loudred.

Jirachi—Wish Maker 
The story revolves around the Millennium Comet, which appears in the night sky for seven days once every thousand years. This is also when the Mythical Pokémon Jirachi awakens from its long slumber to absorb the comet's energy. This energy, in turn, is bringing life to the area known as Forina where it rests. This time, however, a magician known as Butler and his  girlfriend Diane unearth the stone that encases Jirachi, and take it away from Forina.

Meanwhile, in celebration of the Millennium Comet's appearance, Ash Ketchum and his friends May, Max and Brock arrive at a wide crater, which is where the festival of the Millennium Comet is meant to be. Upon seeing nothing where the festival should be, they decide to wait until morning and go to sleep. While they're sleeping, the festival arrives; Pikachu, Ash's Pokémon companion, notices first and wakes all the others, and they watch the festival being set up.

At the festival, May buys a seven-panelled novelty that is said to grant a person one wish if a panel is closed for each night the comet appears and is visible in the sky. Later, Ash and Max accidentally volunteer for one of Butler's magic tricks because Max hears a voice coming from the rock Diane is holding, and runs down to the stage. Max is introduced to Jirachi, who he hears talking from inside the rock. Butler lets Max take the rock, from which Jirachi emerges later that night. Hoping its wishing ability is true, Max wishes for much candy, and it appears – but it is revealed that instead of creating the candy, Jirachi teleported it from a stall in the festival.

The intentions of Butler are soon revealed: he was a former scientist for Team Magma who was seeking to resurrect the Legendary Pokémon Groudon. Butler had devised the perfect system, but could not find the necessary amount of power to fuel and was fired from Team Magma, to his humiliation. To try and fuel his machine again, he hoped to use Jirachi's energy for his own purposes. Seeing this danger, the Pokémon Absol, whose presence usually indicated impending disaster, arrives to help Jirachi and alert the group.

Butler attempts to harness Jirachi's power, but is interrupted inside the circus tent by Ash and his friends. With the help of Diane and Absol, they take Butler's bus to Forina so that Jirachi can go home; unknown to them, Butler's Mightyena places a tracking device on the bus as it is leaving. As Ash and his friends travel along bumpy terrain, the device falls off, but Butler still discovers where they are headed. Before the day Jirachi has to return, Max feels upset about losing his new friend, so Ash tells him about one of his friends, Misty. He explains that even though they don't see each other anymore, they will always be friends (this dialogue was different in the original, where Ash just mentions that a thousand years to Jirachi would feel like just an instant to him). Before the group can make it back to Forina, they realize that Butler had followed them there and set a trap. Butler manages to once again steal Jirachi in an attempt to take its power again.

When Butler sets his plan in motion, however, a fake Groudon monster is created instead of the real thing. Absorbing the energy from the surrounding area, the monster begins to turn Forina into a wasteland, killing all plants in sight and absorbing all living creatures, including May, Brock and Team Rocket, who had followed them the whole way. When Diane is absorbed by the fake Groudon, Butler realizes his long-time relationship with her is what is more important, and with Ash and Max's help he is able to distract the fake Groudon.

Eventually, Jirachi reabsorbs the energy used to create Groudon, and uses Doom Desire to destroy it for good, before leaving for another thousand years of slumber. May, in all the excitement, forgets to close the last panel of her novelty, but simply brushes it off. Though she never reveals what she wished for, she is confident it will still come true. Before they leave Forina, Max hears Jirachi's voice one last time, reminding him that they will always be friends.

During the end credits, May gets tired of walking until the man who sold her the wishing star gives them a lift on his truck. Then they look at stars, the group sees constellations which form Pokémon from Teddiursa to Pikachu, and they all watch the festival's fireworks before continuing their adventure.

Cast

Reception 
The film was a box office hit. It made  at the Japanese box office. It became the second highest-grossing domestic film of the year in Japan.

Critical reception 

As opposed to previous films in the series, Pokémon: Jirachi, Wish Maker got fairly positive reviews. Film Music Central gave it a positive review saying that "It’s a fun story, it’s got an adorable mythical Pokémon at the center of the action, and a fairly straightforward plot".

Release

Home media 

The original Japanese DVD and VHS were released on December 19, 2003. The English dub was released directly to VHS and DVD by Buena Vista Home Entertainment on June 1, 2004. This was the second Pokémon film (the first being Pokémon: Mewtwo Returns) to be released directly to DVD and VHS in the US. The film was released on DVD in the UK on October 23, 2006 to celebrate the Pokémon 10th Anniversary Tour in Britain. In the UK, the film was released by Paramount Home Entertainment after Bob and Harvey Weinstein left Miramax on September 30, 2005. The film was not released on DVD in Australia and New Zealand until November 9, 2016. Paramount Home Entertainment re-released the film on Blu-ray and DVD on April 4, 2022 in the UK after ViacomCBS (now known as Paramount Global) acquired a 49% stake in Miramax for at least $375 million on April 3, 2020.

The film has had a Blu-ray and DVD release in the US by Miramax Echo Bridge Home Entertainment on April 3, 2012, which is now out of print, as a Miramax Multi-Feature compilation with 3 other Pokémon films, Pokémon 4Ever, Pokémon Heroes and Pokémon: Destiny Deoxys.

Notes

References

External links 

 

 Official pokemon.com site
 
 

2003 anime films
Films about wish fulfillment
Jirachi-Wish Maker
Toho animated films
2000s children's animated films
2000s children's fantasy films
2000s Japanese-language films
Miramax films
Films directed by Kunihiko Yuyama
Japanese sequel films
Anime and manga about revenge
Films scored by Shinji Miyazaki
OLM, Inc. animated films